Daria Gaiazova (born 24 December 1983) is a Canadian cross-country skier.

She was born in Russia and moved with her family to Montreal in 1999. Competing since 2001, she finished seventh in the team sprint, 16th in the 4 x 5 km relay, 22nd in the individual sprint, and 42nd in the 7.5 km + 7.5 km double pursuit events. Gaiazova's best finish at the FIS Nordic World Ski Championships was 16th in the 4 x 5 km relay at Sapporo in 2007 while her best individual finish was 28th in the individual sprint event at Liberec two years later.

Her best World Cup finish was 12th on three occasions, all in sprint events, since 2005.

Gaiazova participated at four events in the 2010 Olympics (two individual and two team events), where her best result was the seventh place in the team sprint, together with Sara Renner.

Cross-country skiing results
All results are sourced from the International Ski Federation (FIS).

Olympic Games

World Championships

World Cup

Season standings

Team podiums

 2 podiums – (2 )

References

Notes

Sources

Daria Gaiazova's website

1983 births
Canadian female cross-country skiers
Cross-country skiers at the 2010 Winter Olympics
Cross-country skiers at the 2014 Winter Olympics
Living people
Olympic cross-country skiers of Canada
Russian emigrants to Canada
21st-century Canadian women